Cabin Creek USFS Airport  is a public-use airport in Valley County, Idaho, United States. It is located 17 nautical miles (31 km) east of Big Creek Ranger Station. The airport is owned by the U.S. Forest Service. The airstrip is near Cabin Creek in the Payette National Forest.

Facilities and aircraft 
It has one runway designated 2/20 with a turf and dirt surface measuring 1,750 by 40 feet (533 x 12 m). For the 12-month period ending August 27, 2008, the airport had 900 aircraft operations, an average of 75 per month: 67% air taxi and 33% general aviation.

References

External links 
 Cabin Creek USFS Airstrip at MountainFlying.com
 Topo map as of 1 July 1962 from USGS The National Map
 

Airports in Idaho
Buildings and structures in Valley County, Idaho
United States Forest Service
Transportation in Valley County, Idaho